Ko Joo-yeon (born February 22, 1994) is a South Korean actress who has gained attention in the Korean film industry for her roles in Blue Swallow (2005) and The Fox Family (2006). In 2007 she appeared in the horror film Epitaph as Asako, a young girl suffering from overbearing nightmares and aphasia, becoming so immersed in the role that she had to deal with sudden nosebleeds while on set. Kyu Hyun Kim of Koreanfilm.org highlighted her performance in the film, saying, "[The cast's] acting thunder is stolen by the ridiculously pretty Ko Joo-yeon, another Korean child actress who we dearly hope continues her film career."

Filmography

Film

Television series

Music video

Awards and nominations

References

External links 
 
 
 

South Korean child actresses
South Korean film actresses
South Korean television actresses
21st-century South Korean actresses
1994 births
Living people
Konkuk University alumni